Chibi most often refers to:
 Chibi (style), a super-deformed style of Japanese-influenced caricature
Chibi, Hubei (赤壁 lit. Red Cliff), a county-level city in southeastern Hubei, China.

Chibi may also refer to:

Places
 Chibi Subdistrict, Huangzhou District, Huanggang, Hubei, China
 Chibi Town, in Chibi City
 Chivi District, formerly Chibi, in the Masvingo Province of Zimbabwe

Other uses
 Battle of Red Cliffs, or Battle of Chibi, a decisive naval battle in the winter of AD 208–9 near the city of Chibi
 Red Cliff (Peking opera), 2008 opera dramatizing the battle
 Red Cliff (film), or Chibi, a 2009 film about the battle
 Chibi, a fictional character in the Urusei Yatsura manga series
 Chibi, the lead singer of the band The Birthday Massacre
 ChiBi, or Cherrybelle, an Indonesian girl group
 Chibi-usa or Little Bunny, a fictional character in the Sailor Moon manga series

See also
 
 Chibi Vampire, the English title of a Japanese manga series
 Cheebies, animated characters in Waybuloo
 Red Cliff (disambiguation)